Coumba Cissé (born 21 August 1975) is a Senegalese former basketball player who competed in the 2000 Summer Olympics. She was born in Dakar.

References

1975 births
Living people
Basketball players from Dakar
Senegalese women's basketball players
Olympic basketball players of Senegal
Basketball players at the 2000 Summer Olympics
African Games bronze medalists for Senegal
African Games medalists in basketball
Competitors at the 2003 All-Africa Games